Surface roughness scattering or interface roughness scattering is the elastic scattering of a charged particle by an imperfect interface between two different materials.  It is an important effect in electronic devices which contain narrow layers, such as field effect transistors and quantum cascade lasers.

Description

Interface roughness scattering is most noticeable in confined systems, in which the energies for charge carriers are determined by the locations of interfaces.  An example of such a system is a quantum well, which may be constructed from a sandwich of different layers of semiconductor.  Variations in the thickness of these layers therefore causes the energy of particles to be dependent on their in-plane location in the layer.  Although the roughness  varies in a complicated way on a microscopic scale, it can be considered to exhibit a Gaussian distribution characterised by a height  and a correlation length  such that

Notes

Scattering